James Baldwin was an early settler and blacksmith in Los Angeles, California, arriving some time after 1858. He was a member of the Los Angeles Common Council, the governing body of that city, in 1859–60.

References

19th-century American politicians
American blacksmiths
California pioneers
Los Angeles Common Council (1850–1889) members
Year of birth missing
Year of death missing